Robert James Leary III (born December 3, 1963) is an American professional baseball scout and former coach. On November 16, 2012, he was named bench coach of the Miami Marlins of Major League Baseball, on the staff of new manager Mike Redmond. He had been a coaching assistant with the 2010–2011 Boston Red Sox and an instructor, catcher and manager in minor league baseball. He was fired by the Marlins on May 17, 2015.

Leary graduated from Junipero Serra High School (San Mateo, California), where he was a teammate of Barry Bonds. He attended the College of San Mateo before graduating from Louisiana State University. A 12th-round choice of the Montreal Expos in the  amateur draft, he played in the Expo farm system for five seasons (1986–90), peaking at the Triple-A level in 1990 with two games played for the Indianapolis Indians of the American Association. The 5 foot, 10 inch (1.78 m), 189-pound (86 kg), right-handed batting and -throwing catcher compiled a batting average of .225 in 694 at bats during the course of his playing career. He then managed for four seasons at the Class A level in the Montreal organization with the Rockford Expos of the Midwest League and the West Palm Beach Expos of the Florida State League before serving the Marlins (then known as the Florida Marlins) as an advance scout, roving catching instructor and field coordinator of minor league instruction from  through .

In , Leary joined the Red Sox as the team's minor league catching instructor, and was promoted to field coordinator the following season. After seven years in that role, he joined the Boston coaching staff for the 2010 season as an assistant at the Major League level. In August 2010, Leary became Boston's acting first-base coach upon the emergency leave of Ron Johnson. Johnson and Leary were released at the close of the Red Sox' disappointing 2011 season. Leary then spent  as the field coordinator for the Cleveland Indians. On May 17, 2015, Leary and manager Redmond were relieved of their duties for the Marlins.

References

External links

1963 births
Living people
Arizona Diamondbacks scouts
Baseball coaches from California
Baseball players from San Francisco
Boston Red Sox coaches
Gulf Coast Expos players
Indianapolis Indians players
Jacksonville Expos players
Louisiana State University alumni
LSU Tigers baseball players
Major League Baseball bench coaches
Major League Baseball first base coaches
Miami Marlins coaches
Miami Marlins scouts
Minor league baseball managers
Rockford Expos players
West Palm Beach Expos players